Sud Express (also called Surexpreso  and Sud Expresso ) is an overnight passenger train connecting Lisbon with Hendaye, a French commune on the Franco-Spanish border. The original service, operated by the Compagnie Internationale des Wagons-Lits, ran to Calais via Madrid and Paris.

The service was suspended in March 2020 due to the outbreak of the COVID-19 pandemic and has not been resumed since.

History

The inaugural trip of the Sud Express took place on 21 October 1887 connecting Lisbon via Madrid to Paris in 45 hours and services were extended on 4 November 1887 to Calais. Initially the service was weekly, but in 1888 was run twice weekly and from London Charing Cross. Also in 1888 the British Royal Mail launched connecting package services from Lisbon to Rio de la Plata and Brazil. The service frequency increased further and on 1 January 1907 started to run daily.

It was suspended between 11 December 1937 and 1 August 1939 due to the Spanish Civil War. It was again suspended on 1 November 1940 due to World War II. It restarted between Paris and Lisbon in March 1945.

Events
A 1939 crash near Tolosa, Spain on 29 March killed, amongst others, the artist Romilly Fedden and his novelist wife Katharine Waldo Douglas.

On 11 September 1985, a Sud Express train collided head-on with another train near Moimenta-Alcafache station. The locomotives exploded and the train, carrying about 400 passengers, immediately caught fire.  Forty-nine deaths were officially confirmed, most caused by the fire, although unofficial estimates put the number of deaths between 100 and 150. A memorial was erected on site.

The service today

With the 1989 opening of the LGV Atlantique, the direct service was discontinued in favour of a (faster) combination of two different trains. The original connection from and to Paris is now made with one TGV to Irun and from Hendaye (the twin border towns on opposite sides of the French/Spanish border).

The continuing Sud Express runs as a night train from Irun at the French/Spanish border to Lisbon and from Lisbon to Hendaye. Until April 2010, facilities existed for 2nd class seated accommodation, 2nd class couchette cars (6-bunk compartments), and 1st class private sleeping compartments for 1, 2 or 3 passengers.

Previously, first class passengers found a bar of chocolate and a small bottle of port in their compartments upon boarding the train, with dinner served in a well-appointed dining and bar car, and a continental breakfast the following morning. However, by 2019 the restaurant facility is no more and catering has been reduced to very basic meals in the bar car.

The train consists of a Talgo IV set hired from Renfe hauled by a RENFE Class 252 between the Irún/Hendaye and Medina del Campo, a RENFE Class 334 between Medina del Campo and Vilar Formoso and a CP Class 5600 between Vilar Formoso and Lisbon.

The Portuguese Government's strategic plan for transport, published in October 2011, envisaged the withdrawal of the Sud Express. The service (as of January 2019) has so far survived.

In October 2012, CP started an Intercity (later downgraded to InterRegional) service between Porto and Coimbra in order to improve the connection between the Sud Express and northern Portugal. Also from October on this train in only operated by CP-Comboios de Portugal.

Since 25 April 2018, the southbound Sud Express starts at Hendaye (instead of Irún), due to the lack of proper certification from the new fleet of TGV 2N2 operating on the LGV SEA.

Interruption during the COVID-19 Pandemic

Due to the Coronavirus pandemic, the service was suspended on 17 March 2020 and (as of December 2022) has not yet resumed. In March 2021, a representative of the Spanish transport ministry said that the country may stop having night trains even after the end of the coronavirus pandemic.

See also
Lists of named passenger trains
Nord Express

References

External links

International named passenger trains
Night trains
Named passenger trains of France
Named passenger trains of Spain
Named passenger trains of Portugal
Railway services introduced in 1887
Regional rail in Spain
1887 establishments in Europe